Ernest Ako (14 February 1923 – 16 January 2021) was Ghanaian police officer and was the Inspector General of Police of the Ghana Police Service from 30 September 1974 to 17 July 1978. He was also Minister of Interior.

References

1923 births
2021 deaths
Ghanaian police officers
Ghanaian Inspector Generals of Police
Government ministers of Ghana